Andrea is the tenth studio album released by Andrea Bocelli, in 2004. This album, being Bocelli's fifth pop release, peaked at number 1 on the Dutch Albums Top 100, stayed on that chart for 33 weeks, and ended up being certified Gold. The song "L'Attesa" was written by Italian singer Mango.

Track listing

Notes
In the United Kingdom, "Quante volte ti ho cercato" has been replaced by "Domani".

Charts

Weekly charts

Year-end charts

Certifications

References

 

Andrea Bocelli albums
Decca Records albums
2004 classical albums
Classical crossover albums